XHNLO-FM (branded as La Caliente 97.1 FM) is an FM radio station that serves the Laredo, Texas, United States and Nuevo Laredo, Tamaulipas Mexico border area. XHNLO is owned by Multimedios Radio.

References

External links
Multimedios Radio Official Web Site

Radio stations in Nuevo Laredo
Regional Mexican radio stations
Multimedios Radio